A dictionary writing system (DWS), or dictionary production/publishing  system (DPS) is software for writing and producing a dictionary, glossary, vocabulary, or thesaurus.  It may include an editor, a database, a web interface for collaborative work, and various management tools.

External links
 Third international workshop on Dictionary Writing Systems (DWS 2004)
 Fourth international workshop on Dictionary Writing Systems (DWS 2006)

Resources 
 Butler, Lynnika and Heather van Volkinburg. 2007. Fieldworks Language Explorer (FLEx). Language documentation & conservation 1:1. 
 Corris, Miriam, Christopher Manning, Susan Poetsch, and Jane Simpson. 2002. Dictionaries and endangered languages. In David Bradley and Maya Bradley (eds.), Language endangerment and language maintenance. London: RoutledgeCurzon: 329-347.  
 Coward, David E. and Charles E. Grimes. 1995. Making dictionaries: a guide to lexicography and the Multi-Dictionary Formatter (Version 1.0). Waxhaw: Summer Institute of Linguistics.
 De Schryver, G-M and Joffe, D. 2004. ‘On How Electronic Dictionaries are Really Used’ (see elsewhere in the current Proceedings)
 Hosken, Martin. 2006. Lexicon Interchange Format: A description.
 Joffe, David and Gilles-Maurice de Schryver. 2004. TshwaneLex – A state-of-the-art dictionary compilation program. In G. Williams & S. Vessier (eds.). 2004. Proceedings of the eleventh EURALEX international congress, EURALEX 2004, Lorient, France, July 6–10, 2004: 99–104. Lorient: Faculté des Lettres et des Sciences Humaines, Université de Bretagne Sud. 
 McNamara, M. 2003. ‘Dictionaries for all: XML to Final Product’ in Online Proceedings of XML Europe 2003 Conference & Exposition. Powering the Information Society.

Language software